Sigismund Albicus (c.1360 – July 23, 1427) was a Roman Catholic Archbishop of Prague and a Moravian.

Albicus was born at Uničov, Moravia, and entered the University of Prague when quite young, taking his degree in medicine in 1387.

Desiring to pursue the study of civil and canon law with more profit, he went to Italy and received the Doctor's degree in 1404, at Padua.

On his return to Prague, he taught medicine for twenty years in the university. He was appointed physician-in-chief to Wenceslaus IV, who recommended him as successor to the archdiocese of Prague, on the death of its incumbent in 1409.

The canons appointed him to the position, although reluctantly. Albicus held it only four years, and when he resigned, in 1413, Conrad of Vechta was elected in his place.

Albicus later received the Priory of Vyšehrad and the title of Archbishop of Caesarea. He was accused of favouring the new doctrines of Jan Hus and John Wycliffe. He retired to Hungary during the Hussite war, and died there, in 1427. He left three works on medical subjects, which were published after his death: Praxis medendi; Regimen Sanitatis; Regimen pestilentiæ (Leipzig, 1484–87).

References 
 

1360 births
1427 deaths
People from Uničov
Roman Catholic archbishops of Prague
Charles University alumni
Medieval Czech physicians
15th-century Roman Catholic archbishops in the Holy Roman Empire
14th-century physicians
15th-century Latin writers
Roman Catholic titular archbishops of Caesarea